The Middle Ring Road is a system of roads partly encircling the core of Tianjin. It is inside the Outer Ring Road, and encircles the Inner Ring Road.  Originally, the road is not divided and has many traffic lights, but has interchanges at major roads. Today, most segments of the road has been upgraded to expressway standards, with the exception of the section that it shares with the Outer Ring Road in the northeast. 

Road transport in Tianjin
Ring roads in China